The IPAI-26 Tuca was a Brazilian single engined high-wing light utility aircraft.

Design and development
The project was born by engineer D. Lucato, who had just finished his degree in aeronautical engineering at the Federal University of São Carlos, a simple and economical two-seater airplane capable of landing at airports with limited infrastructure.

The aircraft was designed as a shoulder-wing monoplane with conventional T-tail and rigid nose wheel landing gear. The fuselage was made of welded steel tubes and was clad with composite materials, while the braced wings were made of wood. The cabin, which was entered through side doors, had three seats, with the third seat removable to load cargo. The aircraft was powered by a Lycoming O-235-C-1 4-stroke boxer engine producing 80 kW.

Variant
IPAI-3
Designation of the planned production version, whose newly developed wings would have had a supercritical airfoil and integrated flaps.

Specifications

References

External links
Photo of the IPAI-26 Tuca

Single-engined tractor aircraft
High-wing aircraft
1970s Brazilian civil aircraft
1970s Brazilian civil utility aircraft
Aircraft first flown in 1979